Sergei Rudolfovich Shabanov (born February 24, 1974) is a Belarusian professional ice hockey goaltender who participated at the 2010 IIHF World Championship as a member of the Belarus men's national ice hockey team. He also played for Belarus at the 2002 Winter Olympics in Salt Lake City.

References

External links

1974 births
Living people
Belarusian ice hockey goaltenders
Ice hockey players at the 2002 Winter Olympics
Olympic ice hockey players of Belarus
SKA Saint Petersburg players
Ice hockey people from Minsk
Metallurg Novokuznetsk players